Minnesota is known for a politically active citizenry, with populism being a longstanding force among the state's political parties. Minnesota has consistently high voter turnout; in the 2008 U.S. presidential election, 77.8% of eligible Minnesotans voted – the highest percentage of any U.S. state or territory – versus the national average of 61.7%. This was due in part to its same day voter registration laws; previously unregistered voters can register on election day, at their polls, with evidence of residency.

The major political parties are the Minnesota Democratic–Farmer–Labor Party (DFL) and the Republican Party of Minnesota, along with the Grassroots-Legalize Cannabis and Legal Marijuana Now parties since 2018. The DFL was founded in 1944 when the Minnesota Democratic Party and Minnesota Farmer–Labor Party merged. The party is affiliated with the national Democratic Party. Supporters of the DFL are often referred to as "DFLers" in Minnesota by both members and non-members of the party as an alternative to "Democrats." The state Republican Party is affiliated with the national Republican Party.

History

Historically, the state was a Republican stronghold, never voting Democratic from statehood until 1932, however, since then it has voted Democratic all but thrice- 1952, 1956, and 1972. 1952 is also the last time the state voted for a non-incumbent Republican, and only once (2016) has the state voted to the right of the nation since. Minnesotans have voted for Democratic presidential candidates ever since 1976, more times consecutively than any other state outside of the south, and longer than any other ongoing streak. Minnesota and the District of Columbia were the only electoral votes not won by incumbent Republican President Ronald Reagan in 1984. Minnesota voters instead chose former vice president and Senator Walter Mondale, a Minnesota native. Mondale or Hubert Humphrey were on the Democratic ticket as candidates for president or Vice President in the 1964, 1968, 1976, 1980, and 1984 elections.

In the early 2000s, presidential campaigns have viewed the 27 electoral college votes from Minnesota, Wisconsin, and Iowa as a bloc that is subject to swing toward either major party, and equal in value to Florida's 27 electoral votes. This analysis resulted in dozens of visits by candidates in the final months of both the 2000 and 2004 campaigns.
However, in the 2008 United States presidential election, Barack Obama won the state by more than 10 percentage points.

Minnesota's congressional delegation is split with 4 Democratic and 4 Republican members of Congress and mostly has been split since the early 1990s. (See United States congressional delegations from Minnesota.)

In the 2006 mid-term election, Democrats were elected to all state offices except for governor and lieutenant governor, where Republicans Tim Pawlenty and Carol Molnau narrowly won reelection. The DFL also posted double-digit gains in both houses of the legislature, elected DFLer Amy Klobuchar to the U.S. Senate, and increased the Democratic U.S. House caucus by one, Tim Walz (MN-01).

However, in the 2010 mid-terms, the 8th district, a Democratic stronghold for decades in the Iron Range, elected Republican Chip Cravaack over long-time incumbent Jim Oberstar, splitting the delegation again, 4 to 4. Republicans also captured both houses of the Minnesota Legislature for the first time in decades. However, Democratic candidate Mark Dayton won control of the governorship, making all of Minnesota's statewide elected officials Democrats. In the 2012 election, Democrat Rick Nolan recaptured Oberstar's seat, bringing the ratio to 5 Democrats and 3 Republicans again at the national level. They also captured majorities in both chambers of the Minnesota Legislature.

However, during the 2018 mid-term elections the Republican party recovered both the 8th district and the 1st district, as the former representative of the first district, Tim Walz (D) ran for and was elected governor. The Minnesota Democratic–Farmer–Labor Party flipped two Twin Cities suburban districts, the 2nd and the 3rd district with candidates Angie Craig and Dean Phillips, which maintained the ratio of 5 Democrats and 3 Republicans representing Minnesota at the national level.

The 2018 mid-term election also saw the election of Ilhan Omar as representative of Minnesota's 5th congressional district. She gained national recognition for her involvement with The Squad, a progressive group of newly elected representatives including New York Representative Alexandria Ocasio-Cortez and for a July 14, 2019 tweet by President Donald Trump saying the four Democratic members of Congress, should "go back and help fix the totally broken and crime infested places from which they came. Then come back and show us how it is done" in response to attacks from members of the group on how he was running the country.

Third party movements
The progressive Minnesota Farmer–Labor Party, formed in 1920, provided three governors, four United States senators, and eight members of the U.S. House of Representatives from the 1920s until its merger with the Democratic Party in 1944.

The moderate Reform Party was able to elect the former mayor of Brooklyn Park, and former professional wrestler, Jesse Ventura to the governorship in 1998. The Minnesota branch of the Reform party split off from the national party due to unhappiness about Pat Buchanan's influence in the party, and was renamed the Independence Party. The Independence Party had been able to sustain sufficient support to maintain major party status until 2014.

The state's Green Party has elected several city council members and other local office-holders in Duluth, Minneapolis and Winona, and has made strong runs for state legislature during the past two election cycles. In 2000, Green Party candidate Ralph Nader received just over 5% of the presidential votes cast, gaining Major Party status for the party. The Green Party lost that status in 2004, but retains minor party status having exceeded a 2% threshold.

In the 2006 election, voters in Minneapolis approved a referendum (by a decisive 65% to 35%) to utilize the single transferable vote (STV)—commonly referred to as "instant-runoff voting" and "ranked choice voting"—in future city elections, which is expected to be a boon for third parties. The drive for IRV began in the 1990s as part of the Green Party's platform, although all political parties except the Republicans supported it in the Minneapolis referendum.

Government
As in the national government of the United States, power is divided among three branches: legislative, executive, and judicial.

Legislature
The Minnesota Legislature is a bicameral body consisting of the Senate and the House of Representatives. The state has 67 districts, each covering about 73,500 people. Each district has one senator and two representatives (each district being divided into A and B sections). Senators serve for four years and representatives for two years.

The Legislature convenes in regular session each odd-numbered year on the first Tuesday after the first Monday in January. In even-numbered years, it convenes on a date set by joint agreement of both houses. The state constitution limits the Legislature to meeting 120 legislative days during each biennium. In addition, the Legislature may not meet in regular session after the first Monday following the third Saturday in May of any year. During this time, neither house may adjourn for more than three days without the consent of the other.

Minnesota's legislature has DFL majorities in both houses.

Senate

House of Representatives

Executive
The executive branch is headed by Governor Tim Walz, whose term began on January 7, 2019. The lieutenant governor is Peggy Flanagan. The offices of governor and lieutenant governor have four-year terms and are elected as a single ticket. The governor has a cabinet consisting of the leaders of various government agencies in the state, called commissioners. The other constitutional offices are the secretary of state, state auditor, and attorney general.

Judiciary
Minnesota's court system has three levels. Most cases start in the district courts, which are courts of general jurisdiction. There are 272 district court judges in ten judicial districts. Appeals from the trial courts and challenges to certain governmental decisions are heard by the Minnesota Court of Appeals, consisting of sixteen judges who typically sit in three-judge panels. The seven-justice Minnesota Supreme Court hears all appeals from the Tax Court, the Worker's Compensation Court, first-degree murder convictions, and discretionary appeals from the Court of Appeals; it also has original jurisdiction over election disputes. All judges must stand for election in the first general election occurring more than a year after their appointment by the governor and every six years thereafter.

Regional government
Below the city and county levels of government found in the United States, Minnesota has other entities that provide governmental oversight and planning. Some actions in the Twin Cities metropolitan area are coordinated by the Metropolitan Council, and many lakes and rivers are overseen by watershed districts and soil and water conservation districts.

There are seven Anishinaabe reservations and four Dakota communities in Minnesota. These communities govern themselves independently.

Federal representation

Minnesota's two U.S. Senators are elected at large:
 Senior U.S. Senator Amy Klobuchar (DFL)
 Junior U.S. Senator Tina Smith (DFL)

Minnesota has eight congressional districts. There were 9th and 10th districts but they were eliminated in 1963 and 1933 respectively. Since the early 1960s, the state's congressional districts have been drawn by a judicial panel due to the Legislature's failure to enact a redistricting plan after every decennial census.

U.S. House of Representatives:
 Minnesota's 1st congressional district extends across southern Minnesota from the border with South Dakota to the border of Wisconsin – Rep. Brad Finstad (Republican).
 Minnesota's 2nd congressional district spans the width of the entire southern metro area and contains all of Scott, Le Sueur, Goodhue and Rice Counties – Rep. Angie Craig (DFL).
 Minnesota's 3rd congressional district encompasses the suburbs of Hennepin County to the north, west, and south of Minneapolis – Rep. Dean Phillips (DFL).
 Minnesota's 4th congressional district covers most of Ramsey County including all of St. Paul and several St. Paul suburbs – Rep. Betty McCollum (DFL).
 Minnesota's 5th congressional district covers eastern Hennepin County, including the entire city of Minneapolis, Minnesota, along with parts of Anoka and Ramsey counties – Rep. Ilhan Omar (DFL).
 Minnesota's 6th congressional district includes most or all of Benton, Sherburne, Stearns, Wright, Anoka, and Washington counties – Rep. Tom Emmer (Republican).
 Minnesota's 7th congressional district covers almost all of the western side of Minnesota from the Canada–US border down to Lincoln County and is the largest district in the state – Rep. Michelle Fischbach (Republican).
 Minnesota's 8th congressional district covers the northeastern part of Minnesota and includes Duluth, Hibbing, and the Mesabi Range – Rep. Pete Stauber (Republican).

Gallery of members of the U.S. Senate

Gallery of members of the U.S. House of Representatives

Minnesota is part of the United States District Court for the District of Minnesota in the federal judiciary. The district's cases are appealed to the St.Louis-based United States Court of Appeals for the Eighth Circuit.

Historical figures of note

John Pillsbury

John S. Pillsbury (July 29, 1828 – October 18, 1901) served as the 8th Governor of Minnesota from January 7, 1876, to January 10, 1882. Pillsbury was a noted philanthropist and often anonymously donated funds to causes he favored. In particular, he helped the University of Minnesota recover from debt in its early years, and later served as a regent. Since then, he has become known as "The Father of the University". Pillsbury Hall at the University of Minnesota is named in his honor. He tried his hand at several different types of businesses, including hardware, real estate and lumber, though his greatest success came when he founded C.A. Pillsbury and Company along with his family (it is named for his nephew, Charles Alfred Pillsbury).

Frank Kellogg

Frank B. Kellogg (December 22, 1856 – December 21, 1937) was elected as a Republican to the United States Senate from Minnesota in 1916 and served from March 4, 1917, to March 3, 1923. He was a delegate to the Fifth International Conference of American States at Santiago, Chile in 1923, and served as Ambassador Extraordinary and Plenipotentiary to the United Kingdom from 1923 to 1925. He was United States Secretary of State in the Cabinet of President Calvin Coolidge 1925–1929. In 1928, he was awarded the Freedom of the City in Dublin, Ireland and in 1929 the government of France made him a member of the Legion of Honor. As Secretary of State, he coauthored the Kellogg-Briand Pact, signed in 1928. Proposed by its other namesake, French foreign minister Aristide Briand, the treaty intended to provide for "the renunciation of war as an instrument of national policy." He was awarded the 1929 Nobel Peace Prize in recognition. He was associate judge of the Permanent Court of International Justice from 1930 to 1935.

Floyd B. Olson

Floyd B. Olson (November 13, 1891 – August 22, 1936) served as the 22nd Governor of Minnesota from January 6, 1931, to August 22, 1936. He was a member of the Minnesota Farmer–Labor Party, and was the first member of the Farmer–Labor Party to win the office of governor in Minnesota. The party, founded in 1918 had a good deal of success in Minnesota as a statewide third party, with three governors and four U.S. senators serving during the 1920s and 1930s. The party platform called for protection for farmers and labor union members, government ownership of some industries, and social security laws. There were unsuccessful attempts to develop the party into a national Farmer–Labor Party in the early 1920s. The Minnesota Democratic Party, led by Hubert H. Humphrey, was able to merge with the Minnesota Farmer-Labor Party in 1944. Since 1944 the two parties together make up the Minnesota Democratic–Farmer–Labor Party.

Harold Stassen

Harold E. Stassen (April 13, 1907 – March 4, 2001) was the 25th Governor of Minnesota from 1939 to 1943 and a later perennial candidate for other offices, most notably and frequently President of the United States. At 31 he was the youngest governor to serve in Minnesota and was seen as an "up and comer" after delivering the keynote address at the 1940 Republican National Convention. At that convention, he helped secure the Republican Party nomination for Wendell Willkie. Stassen was a delegate at the San Francisco Conference that established the United Nations, and president of the University of Pennsylvania from 1948 to 1953.

Stassen was later best known for being a perennial candidate for the Republican Party nomination for president. His strongest bid for the presidential nomination was in 1948, when he won a series of upset victories in early primaries. Polls showed that he would beat Harry S. Truman if nominated. He lost the nomination to Thomas Dewey, however, who had already lost in the presidential election of 1944 to Franklin D. Roosevelt. Stassen played a key role in the 1952 Republican contest when he released his delegates to Dwight D. Eisenhower.  This helped Eisenhower to defeat Robert A. Taft on the first ballot. He served in the Eisenhower Administration, filling posts including director of the Mutual Security Administration (foreign aid) and Special Assistant to the President for Disarmament. During this period he held cabinet rank and led a quixotic effort to "dump Nixon" at the 1956 Republican National Convention. Stassen gained a reputation as a liberal, particularly when, as president of the American Baptist Convention in 1963, he joined Martin Luther King Jr. in his march on Washington, D.C. He was a prime representative of the socially-progressive "Rockefeller Republican" wing of American Republicanism.

Hubert Humphrey

Hubert Humphrey (May 27, 1911 – January 13, 1978) was the 38th Vice President of the United States, serving under President Lyndon Johnson. Humphrey twice served as a United States Senator from Minnesota, and served as Democratic Majority Whip. He was a founder of the Minnesota Democratic–Farmer–Labor Party and Americans for Democratic Action. He served as mayor of Minneapolis from July 2, 1945, to November 30, 1948. In 1968 Humphrey was the nominee of the Democratic Party in the United States presidential election but lost to Republican Richard M. Nixon. In one of the most renowned speeches in American political history, Humphrey told the 1948 Democratic National Convention: "the time has arrived in America for the Democratic Party to get out of the shadows of states' rights and walk forthrightly into the bright sunshine of human rights," winning support for a pro-civil-rights plank in the Party's platform.

Eugene McCarthy

Eugene McCarthy (March 29, 1916 – December 10, 2005) was a longtime member of the U.S. Congress. He served in the U.S. House of Representatives from 1949 to 1959 and the U.S. Senate from 1959 to 1971. His anti-war stance and popularity prior to the 1968 Democratic National Convention likely convinced Lyndon Johnson to drop out of the race. In the 1968 presidential election, McCarthy unsuccessfully sought the Democratic nomination for President of the United States to succeed incumbent Lyndon Johnson on an anti-Vietnam War platform. He would unsuccessfully seek the presidency five times altogether. (He is not to be confused with Senator Joseph Raymond McCarthy who sought out Communist spies within the federal government.)

Orville Freeman

Orville Freeman (May 9, 1918 – February 20, 2003) was a co-founder and chairman of the Minnesota Democratic–Farmer–Labor Party and a three-term Governor of Minnesota, the first from the DFL. Freeman served as United States Secretary of Agriculture under presidents Kennedy and Johnson. He recognized that needy people were starving just as grain surpluses had driven prices down. Freeman advocated farm exports and supported controls on production sometimes idling farm land for years. Freeman worked toward the pilot school breakfast program and is most often remembered for today's U.S. Food Stamp Program.

Walter Mondale

Walter Mondale (January 5, 1928 – April 19, 2021) was the 42nd vice president of the United States (1977–1981) under President Jimmy Carter. He was also a two-term United States Senator from Minnesota and the Democratic Party nominee for president in 1984 against the incumbent, Republican Ronald Reagan. Mondale suffered a crushing defeat as Reagan was re-elected in a landslide victory in which Mondale carried only his home state of Minnesota and the District of Columbia. Mondale also quickly stepped into the 2002 U.S. Senate race against Norm Coleman, when Paul Wellstone died in a plane crash two weeks before the election. Coleman narrowly won the election, 49.5% to 47.3%.

Paul Wellstone

Paul Wellstone (July 21, 1944 – October 25, 2002) was a two-term U.S. Senator from Minnesota. He was a member of the Democratic–Farmer–Labor Party and was a professor of political science at Carleton College before being elected to the Senate in 1990. Wellstone was in a line of left-of-center or progressive Senators of the DFL. The first three, Hubert H. Humphrey, Eugene McCarthy, and Walter F. Mondale, were all prominent in the national Democratic Party and Wellstone became a leading spokesman for the progressive wing in his time. He served in the Senate from 1991 until his death in a plane crash on October 25, 2002. His wife, Sheila, and daughter, Marcia, also died in the crash. They had two other grown children, David and Mark, who now co-chair the Wellstone Action nonprofit group.

Jesse Ventura

Jesse Ventura (born July 15, 1951, as James George Janos), also known as "The Body", "The Mind", and "Governing Body", is an American politician, Navy SEAL member, professional wrestler, actor, and radio talk show host. In the Minnesota gubernatorial election of 1998 he was elected the 38th Governor of Minnesota and served from January 4, 1999, to January 6, 2003, without seeking a second term. Ventura ran as a candidate for the Reform Party of Minnesota (but joined the Independence Party of Minnesota when it broke from its association with the Reform Party of the United States of America) and narrowly, but unexpectedly beat the major-party candidates: Saint Paul mayor Norm Coleman (Republican) and Minnesota Attorney General Hubert H. "Skip" Humphrey III (Democratic–Farmer–Labor). Ventura went on to gain the highest approval rating of any governor in Minnesota history, with some polls ranking his public approval as high as the 73% in 1999, despite controversial statements of his. His campaign consisted of a combination of aggressive grassroots events and original television spots, designed by quirky advertising man Bill Hillsman, using the phrase "Don't vote for politics as usual." He spent considerably less than his opponents (about $600,000), and is widely regarded as one of the first candidates to effectively use the Internet as a medium of reaching out to voters in a political campaign.

See also

List of political parties in Minnesota

References

External links